Candid was a mobile app for anonymous discussions. It used machine learning to create personalized newsfeeds of opinions and real conversations, and also for moderation and filtering. Users posted under pseudonyms such as "HyperMantis", "SincereGiraffe", "GroundedTurtle" and "ExuberantRaptor", that are unique for each thread.

Founder and CEO Bindu Reddy said that she needed "a place to express myself and engage in discussions where ideas can be debated on their own merits instead of being used to attack me as a person", which Candid tried to solve by redirecting off-topic comments to their appropriate groups, removing spam and flagging negative posts. They used natural language processing to identify hate speech, slander and threats, and removed them accordingly with human intervention. Candid software analyzed topics and tried to flag rumors and lies as such. Users could flag problematic posts and a team of ten contractors would review them individually. With time the system analyzed a user's interactions and give them labels, such as socializer, explorer, positive, influencer, hater, gossip, etc.

In June 2017, Candid announced that it would be shut down because its parent company, Post Intelligence, was being acquired. The app was forecast to close on June 23, 2017, but didn't actually close until June 25, 2017. The company was bought out by Uber in June 2017.

Notes

References 

Mobile applications
IOS software
Anonymous social media